The 2009 Rás Tailteann was the 57th edition of the Rás Tailteann cycle race. The race took place over 8 days between 17–24 May 2009. The race was sponsored by FBD Insurance.

Results

General classification

Jersey progress

References

External links
Official Website

Ras Tailteann, 2009
Ras Tailteann, 2009